Acanalonia is a genus of planthopper in the fulgorid family Acanaloniidae.

Species
Species include:

The following species were moved in 2012 to the new genus Bulldolonia Gnezdilov, 2012:
Acanalonia brevifrons Muir, 1924: Synonym of Bulldolonia brevifrons (Muir, 1924)
Acanalonia depressa Melichar, 1901: Synonym of Bulldolonia depressa (Melichar, 1901)
Acanalonia impressa Metcalf & Bruner, 1930: Synonym of Bulldolonia impressa (Metcalf & Bruner, 1930)

References

External links
 Genus Acanalonia Spinola, 1839  Planthoppers of North America University of Delaware – College of Agriculture & Natural Resources

Acanaloniidae